Tom Gladdis (born 24 February 1991 on the Isle of Wight) is a racing driver, currently competing in the FIA Formula Two Championship.

Career

Formula BMW
Gladdis made his circuit racing debut in the Formula BMW UK series in 2007, after being one of five drivers selected for a scholarship. Competing for Nexa Racing, Gladdis ended up fourteenth in the championship, in its final season before being merged into Formula BMW Europe, with a solitary top ten finish at Snetterton. Gladdis also competed in two rounds of the Formula BMW ADAC series for Team Zinner at Hockenheim, amassing eight points to finish 32nd in the championship, and sixteenth out of all rookies. He also competed in the pan-Asian series for Ao's Racing Team, as a team-mate to Sebastián Saavedra. To round off his season, he competed in the World Final in Valencia for Master Motorsport, finishing 23rd.

Star Mazda
After testing for Andersen Racing in late 2007, Gladdis signed for the team to contest the Star Mazda Championship for 2008. Gladdis finished sixth in the championship standings, amassing three fastest laps, two pole positions and a win at Portland International Raceway. He also finished second in the Portland double-header, and finished third at Mosport International Raceway.

Formula Two
2009 saw Gladdis move up to the FIA Formula Two Championship, driving car number 24. A sixth at Spa, and an eighth at Brno were Gladdis' only points-scoring races, eventually finishing 20th in the championship. Competing in only the two British and Czech rounds in the 2010, Gladdis achieved second place in the second Brands Hatch race; combined with a fifth place in the first race he scored 28 points, finishing 15th in the championship.

Racing record

Career summary

† As Gladdis was a guest driver, he was ineligible for points.

Star Mazda Championship

Complete FIA Formula Two Championship results
(key) (Races in bold indicate pole position) (Races in italics indicate fastest lap)

References

External links
  
 

1991 births
Living people
Sportspeople from the Isle of Wight
British people of Gibraltarian descent
English racing drivers
Formula BMW ADAC drivers
Formula BMW UK drivers
Indy Pro 2000 Championship drivers
FIA Formula Two Championship drivers
MRF Challenge Formula 2000 Championship drivers
Formula BMW Asia drivers
Fluid Motorsport Development drivers